The Singing Outlaw is a 1938 American "B" movie Western film directed by Joseph H. Lewis and starring Bob Baker as a singing cowboy.

Production
The film was the third that Lewis had directed, after Navy Spy (1937), which he co-directed with Crane Wilbur and Courage of the West.
This was the second of four films in which Fuzzy Knight played the comic sidekick to Universal's new singing cowboy, Bob Baker.

Synopsis

A singing outlaw named Cueball and a U.S. Marshal kill each other in a shoot-out.
A bystander (Baker) decides to take over the Marshall's identity.
To trap the local outlaw gang he pretends to be Cueball.
He finds himself struggling to stop the cattle rustlers and win the love of the daughter of a rancher (Joan Barclay).
Things get complicated when a sheriff captures him with the gang, and he nearly gets hanged before it is proved that he is not Cueball.

Reception

A reviewer said, "The second of Baker's outings as a singing cowboy is notable for Miller's exceptional camera work and Lewis' emphatic direction."

Notes and references
Citations

Sources

External links
 

1938 films
1938 Western (genre) films
Universal Pictures films
Films directed by Joseph H. Lewis
American Western (genre) films
American black-and-white films
1930s American films